Aberaeron Hospital was a community hospital in Aberaeron, Wales. It was managed by the Hywel Dda University Health Board.

History
The hospital has its origins in the Aberaeron Union Workhouse which was completed in 1838. It served as a hospital for injured soldiers during the First World War and became a cottage hospital in 1930.

The hospital closed in 2019 with services relocated to the Aberaeron Integrated Care Centre. Work to demolish the hospital begun in 2021 to make way for an apartment complex.

References

NHS hospitals in Wales
Hospitals in Ceredigion
Hospitals established in 1838
Hospital buildings completed in 1838
Aberaeron
Hywel Dda University Health Board